Horace Augustus Curtis VC (7 March 1891 – 1 July 1968) was an English recipient of the Victoria Cross, the highest and most prestigious award for gallantry in the face of the enemy that can be awarded to British and Commonwealth forces.

Service
Between 1915 and 1928, Curtis served in three theatres of war: the Mediterranean Expeditionary Force, the Egyptian Expeditionary Force and finally the British Expeditionary Force (B. E. F) in France and Belgium.

On 20 June 1918, Curtis returned to England, where he went to Bermondsley Military Hospital in London for treatment for malaria, broken by a furlough, home leave to Fiddlers Green between 24 July until 3 August, the first time in four years.

He was finally cleared to return to his unit in France on 19 August and was back in France by 1 September and to the front by 21 September.

VC action

On 18 October 1918, No. 14107 Sergeant Curtis, 2nd Battalion Royal Dublin Fusiliers fought in action near Le Cateau that earned him the Victoria Cross. The following is the official citation, which appeared in the London Gazette on 6 January 1919.

His VC was presented to him by King George V at Buckingham Palace on 8 March 1919.

Post war
Curtis was discharged on 31 March 1920. He joined the 5th (Territorial) Battalion DCLI on a 3-year engagement at St Columb on 5 May 1920. Private 5431368, he was rapidly promoted to Sergeant and by 27 August 1920 was WO2 (CSM). On 20 December 1921, he transferred to the 4/5th DCLI and on 19 May 1923 his service was terminated at the end of his engagement.

Curtis died on 1 July 1968.

The Medal
His VC is on display in the Lord Ashcroft Collection at the Imperial War Museum, London.

References

Further reading
Monuments to Courage (David Harvey, 1999)
The Register of the Victoria Cross (This England, 1997)
VCs of the First World War - The Final Days 1918 (Gerald Gliddon, 2000)

External links
 Information on Horace Augustus Curtis and other Victoria Cross winners of the Royal Dublin Fusiliers
 

1891 births
1968 deaths
Duke of Cornwall's Light Infantry soldiers
Royal Dublin Fusiliers soldiers
British Army personnel of World War I
British World War I recipients of the Victoria Cross
People from Cornwall
British Army recipients of the Victoria Cross
Military personnel from Cornwall